Paludinella vitrea is a species of minute salt marsh snail with an operculum, an aquatic gastropod mollusk or micromollusk in the family Assimineidae. This species is endemic to Palau.

References

Fauna of Palau
Paludinella
Gastropods described in 1927
Assimineidae
Taxonomy articles created by Polbot